Cesar Chavez High School is a public four-year high school in Stockton, California. It is part of the Stockton Unified School District.

History
Cesar Chavez High School was completed and began educating students in August 2005. It is the newest high school in Stockton Unified School District in the last 50 years. The school was dedicated on August 18, 2005. The school initiated its first classes in August 2005 starting with only Freshman and Sophomore classes, then added a Junior class during the 2006–07 school year with the addition on the school's first varsity teams.

Clubs at Chavez

 Academic Decathlon
 Anime Club
 Art Club
 Avid Club
 Badminton
 Band
 Black Student Union
Body building  
 Brunch Club
 Cambodian Club
 Career Club
 Cheerleaders
 Cross Country
 CSF
 Dance
 Dig-it-Volleyball
 DRAMA
 Fashion Design
 Filipino Club
 Football
 French Honor Society
 Girls Basketball
 Golf Club
 GSA
 Hands on Health
 Hmong Club
 Journalism
 Key Club
 Link Crew
 Mariachi Club
 M.E.Ch.A.
 MESA
 Mythologists
 Orchestra
 Physics Society
 Polynesian Club
 Red Cross Club
 Rocking Titans
 Running Titans
 Science Club
 Singing Titans
 Softball
 Speech Club
 Stagecraft Club
 Step Team Club
 Thespian Club
 Titan Club
 Vietnamese Club

References

External links

 Cesar Chavez High School

High schools in San Joaquin County, California
Educational institutions established in 2005
Public high schools in California
Buildings and structures in Stockton, California
Education in Stockton, California
2005 establishments in California